Leandro Marcos Peruchena Pereira (born 13 July 1991), also known as Leandro, is a Brazilian professional footballer who plays as a forward for Persian Gulf Pro League club Persepolis.

Career

Early years
Born in Araçatuba, State of São Paulo, Leandro began his career on Ferroviária, making his senior debuts in 2011. In the following year he signed with Mogi Mirim, where he earned the nickname of Leandro Banana and went on to appear twice in that year's Campeonato Paulista. In December 2012 he signed with Capivariano, but left the club in May of the following year, joining Icasa.

In January 2014 Leandro signed a short-term contract with Portuguesa. On 1 April, after appearing regularly with Lusa, he moved to Chapecoense, freshly promoted to the Série A.

Chapecoense
Leandro made his top level debut on 27 April 2014, starting in a 1–2 away loss against Sport Recife. He scored his first league goal on 25 September, netting the last of a 3–0 home win against Atlético Paranaense.

Leandro finished the campaign with 10 goals, scoring all of them in the last four months of the League. On 19 December 2014, after being linked with a move to Corinthians, he signed a five-year deal with their fierce rivals Palmeiras.

Palmeiras and transfer to Belgium

Leandro Pereira started the 2015 season with Palmeiras playing regularly in the attack, he scored in his first match for the club in a friendly against Shandong Luneng. Leandro scored only 3 goals in 14 appearances in the Campeonato Paulista, but nonetheless helped the team reach the finals where Palmeiras lost to rivals Santos on penalties. In the beginning of the Série A, Leandro started most of the matches and had great appearances for the team, playing 11 matches and scoring 6 goals. On July, he called the attention of Belgian side Club Brugge, after only 7 months with Palmeiras.

In August 2015, Leandro Pereira signed with Club Brugge on a three-year deal for R$14.2 million, with an option to extend a year. Together with the team, he won the 2015–16 Belgian Pro League, playing 12 matches mainly as a substitute and without scoring a goal.

On 29 June 2016, Leandro returned to Palmeiras after manifestation of manager Cuca to count on another forward in the squad. Leandro signed a loan deal from Club Brugge until 30 June 2017.

Persepolis 

In 24 January 2023, Leandro linked with Persian Gulf Pro League side Persepolis. On 4 February 2023, Leandro joined the team on a one-and-a-half-year deal.

Player profile

Style of play and reception 
He is a forward, but he has the ability to play as a left or right winger too. Accurate shots in difficult situations towards the goal have been known as one of his abilities.

Honours
Mogi Mirim
 Campeonato Paulista do Interior: 2012

Palmeiras
 Campeonato Brasileiro Série A: 2016
 Copa do Brasil: 2015

Club Brugge
 Belgian Pro League: 2015–16

References

External links

Leandro Pereira at playmakerstats.com (English version of ogol.com.br)

1991 births
Living people
People from Araçatuba
Brazilian footballers
Brazilian expatriate footballers
Association football forwards
Campeonato Brasileiro Série A players
Campeonato Brasileiro Série B players
Belgian Pro League players
J1 League players
Associação Ferroviária de Esportes players
Mogi Mirim Esporte Clube players
Capivariano Futebol Clube players
Associação Desportiva Recreativa e Cultural Icasa players
Associação Portuguesa de Desportos players
Associação Chapecoense de Futebol players
Sociedade Esportiva Palmeiras players
Club Brugge KV players
Sport Club do Recife players
Matsumoto Yamaga FC players
Sanfrecce Hiroshima players
Gamba Osaka players
Expatriate footballers in Belgium
Expatriate footballers in Japan
Footballers from São Paulo (state)
Persepolis F.C. players
Persian Gulf Pro League players